Walter Lewis Hyde (1919–2003) was an American physicist, an early contributor to the field of fiber optics. He held patents for devices used in ophthalmology, as well as a panoramic rear-view mirror for automobiles.

Originally from Minnesota, he studied physics at Harvard University. He worked at the Polaroid Corporation in the nascent field of fiber optics. He married Elizabeth Sanford Hyde, and they had six children, including Lewis Hyde. In the 1950s, he worked for the London Office of Naval Research, tracking European physics research. He went on to become the director of development at the American Optical Company, in Southbridge, Massachusetts, and then a professor of optics at the University of Rochester. He then changed gears to administration, and served as provost of New York University until 1972.  He served as president of the Optical Society of America in 1970 

He married Elizabeth Sanford, who became the president of Woodstock Academy's Board of Trustees and helped lead the school's renovation and building project in the early 1990s. The library and media center there is named after her.

References

See also
Optical Society of America#Past Presidents of the OSA

1919 births
2003 deaths
People from Minnesota
Harvard University alumni
University of Rochester faculty
New York University faculty
20th-century American physicists
Optical physicists
Presidents of Optica (society)